Mirjam Müskens (born 24 May 1967) is a Dutch taekwondo practitioner.

She competed at the 2000 Summer Olympics in Sydney. She won a silver medal in welterweight at the 1999 World Taekwondo Championships, defeated by Elena Benítez in the final.

References

External links

1967 births
Living people
Dutch female taekwondo practitioners
Olympic taekwondo practitioners of the Netherlands
Taekwondo practitioners at the 2000 Summer Olympics
World Taekwondo Championships medalists